Paul Anthony Williams (born 16 August 1965) is an English football coach and former professional footballer who played as a striker.

As a player he made 300 appearances in the Premier League for Crystal Palace as well as in the Football League for Charlton Athletic, Brentford, Sheffield Wednesday, Sunderland, Birmingham City, Torquay United and Southend United. He retired in 2000 whilst with Non-league side Canvey Island. He was capped by England at under-21 and B international level.

Since retiring from playing Williams returned to former clubs Charlton Athletic and Crystal Palace where he was an academy coach before emigrating to the United States where he coaches youth soccer.

Playing career
Born in Stratford, East London, Williams was signed by First Division Charlton Athletic from non-league Woodford Town in 1987. Where he was top goal scorer for two successive seasons. This prompted Ron Atkinson to spend nearly a million pounds to bring the Londoner to Sheffield Wednesday in 1990, where he enjoyed a productive partnership with David Hirst. That season he won a League Cup medal at Wembley Stadium when Wednesday defeated Manchester United 1–0. In the same season, Wednesday achieved promotion back to the First Division. Williams moved back to London with Crystal Palace in 1992, in a swap deal involving Mark Bright. In season 1993–94 he won a Football League First Division (second tier) winners medal with Crystal Palace and was second top goal scorer behind Chris Armstrong.

After loans with Sunderland and Birmingham City he returned to Charlton Athletic, followed by a few months at Torquay United before ending his league career with Southend United in 1998, due to injuries.

From there, Williams went on to complete two very successful years playing and coaching at Canvey Island. While there, the club gained consecutive promotions and won two league Cups. Ending his semi-pro playing and coaching career at Bowers FC in Essex in 2002.

Coaching career
Williams continued coaching at the Charlton and Crystal Palace youth academies, before moving to Florida in 2012 where he is currently the Director of Coaching for the Florida Fire Juniors who are affiliated with the MLS team Chicago Fire.

Honours
 Sheffield Wednesday
 League Cup winner 1991
 1st Division Runners-up 1991 
 Crystal Palace
 * 1st Division Champions Medal 1993

References
General

Specific

External links

1965 births
Living people
Footballers from Greater London
English footballers
England under-21 international footballers
England B international footballers
Association football forwards
Aveley F.C. players
Clapton F.C. players
Woodford Town F.C. (1937) players
Charlton Athletic F.C. players
Brentford F.C. players
Sheffield Wednesday F.C. players
Crystal Palace F.C. players
Sunderland A.F.C. players
Birmingham City F.C. players
Torquay United F.C. players
Southend United F.C. players
Canvey Island F.C. players
Premier League players
English Football League players